Bernard Commons (15 May 1913 – 19 April 1965) was an Irish politician. A farmer by profession, he was an unsuccessful candidate at the 1943 and 1944 general elections. He was elected to Dáil Éireann at the Mayo South by-election on 4 December 1945 as a Clann na Talmhan Teachta Dála (TD) for the Mayo South constituency. The by-election was caused by the appointment of Micheál Clery of Fianna Fáil as County Registrar of Dublin. 

He was re-elected at the 1948 general election but lost his seat at the 1951 general election. He was subsequently elected to 7th Seanad by the Agricultural Panel. He stood unsuccessfully at the 1954 general election but was elected to the 8th Seanad. He was defeated at the 1957 Seanad election.

In the early 1940s, Commons was imprisoned for one month in Sligo Prison for his part in the Mayo land agitation, after which he won a Dáil seat.

See also
List of members of the Oireachtas imprisoned since 1923

References

1913 births
1965 deaths
Clann na Talmhan TDs
Clann na Talmhan senators
Members of the 12th Dáil
Members of the 13th Dáil
Members of the 7th Seanad
Members of the 8th Seanad
Politicians from County Mayo
Irish farmers